Collège Saint Marc  is an all-male French Catholic school in Alexandria, Egypt. The school is located in the Shatby neighborhood at the downtown Alexandria.

Collège Saint Marc was founded in 1928 by the De La Salle Brothers to be the second Lassalian school in Alexandria after École Saint Gabriel. Collège Saint Marc was inaugurated on 6 October 1928, by King Fuad I. Built on an area of 35,726 m2, it was at the time of its inauguration the largest educational institution in the Middle East.

Collège Saint Marc is a private educational institution with French as its main teaching language. Students must be accepted beginning at KG1, and successful students remain in the school until they receive their high school diploma. The curriculum at Collège Saint Marc prepares the students for the Egyptian Baccalaureate examination.

Heads of school 
 Br. Pierre Cyprien, FSC (1928–1931)
 Br. Léonce Onésime, FSC (1931–1937)
 Br. Hippolyte Itale, FSC (1937–1939)
 Br. Gustave Astier, FSC (1939–1940)
 Br. Hippolyte Itale, FSC (1940–1946)
 Br. Antonin Louis, FSC (1946–1947)
 Br. Léon André, FSC (1947–1948)
 Br. Antonin Louis, FSC (1948–1956)
 Br. Adrien Polycarpe, FSC (1956–1961)
 Br. Castanié Ildefonse, FSC (1961–1962)
 Br. Gabr Saadé, FSC (1961–1962)
 Br. Emile El Masri, FSC (1962–1963)
 Br. Jacques Boulad, FSC (1962–1979)
 Br. Michel Andrejko, FSC (1979–1983)
 Br. Régis Robbe, FSC (1983–1985)
 Br. Jacques Boulad, FSC (1985–1992)
 Br. Régis Robbe, FSC (1992–1995)
 Br. Georges Absi, FSC (1995–2003)
 Mr. Waguih Hanna Elias (2003–present)

Notable alumni

 Dodi Al-Fayed
 Esmat Abdel Meguid – former Foreign Minister of Egypt and former Secretary-General of the Arab League
 Roshdi Abaza – Egyptian actor
 Mohamed El Shorbagy – World Champion and World No. 1 Squash player

See also 

 Educational institutions in Alexandria

College Bulletin
Lotus No 82 Collège Saint Marc, Alexandria LOTUS 1975–1976 p231 
 LOTUS No 82 1975–1976 P231

External links
 

French international schools in Egypt
International schools in Egypt
Alexandria
Private schools in Alexandria
Schools in Alexandria
International schools in Alexandria
Educational institutions established in 1928
Boys' schools in Egypt
1928 establishments in Egypt